James Croft (2 July 1784  – 9 May 1869) was Archdeacon of Canterbury from 18 June 1825 until his death.

The son of Robert Croft, Canon of York, he was educated at Peterhouse, Cambridge. Croft was ordained in 1810 and held incumbencies at Ingoldmells, Saltwood, Great Chart and Cliffe-at-Hoo.

References

1784 births
1869 deaths
Alumni of Peterhouse, Cambridge
Archdeacons of Canterbury